Senegalese Solidarity Party (in French: Parti de la Solidarité Sénégalaise) was a political party in Senegal. PSS was created in January 1959. It was led by Ibrahima Seydou Ndaw, Cheikh Tidiane Sy and Oumar Diop.

PSS was dissolved after the elections same year, in which it failed to make any impact.

Sources
Zuccarelli, François. La vie politique sénégalaise (1940-1988). Paris: CHEAM, 1988.

Political parties established in 1959
Political parties in Senegal